Mitchell Aaron "Mitch" Piraux (born April 18, 1995) is a Canadian soccer player who currently plays for the UBC Thunderbirds.

Career

Youth and Amateur
Piraux began his youth career with the Calgary Foothills before joining the Vancouver Whitecaps FC Residency program in 2011.  He spent four seasons with the Residency program.

Piraux also played in the Premier Development League for Vancouver Whitecaps FC U-23. In December 2016, Whitecaps FC 2 announced that Piraux would not return to the club for the 2017 season.

Professional
On February 17, 2015, Piraux signed a professional contract with Whitecaps FC 2, a USL affiliate club of Vancouver Whitecaps FC.  He made his professional debut on March 29 in a 4–0 defeat to Seattle Sounders FC 2.

International
Piraux made two appearances for the Canadian under-15 national team in 2010.  He has also been called in to the Canadian under-18 camp.

References

External links
Whitecaps FC 2 bio
USSF Development Academy bio

UBC Thunderbirds bio

1995 births
Living people
Canadian soccer players
Vancouver Whitecaps FC U-23 players
Whitecaps FC 2 players
Association football midfielders
Soccer players from Calgary
USL League Two players
USL Championship players
Canada men's youth international soccer players
UBC Thunderbirds soccer players
University and college soccer players in Canada